"2nd Confession" is a song recorded by South Korean boy band BtoB, released on April 10, 2013.

Background
The digital single titled "2nd Confession" was released as a digital single through various music sites on April 10. The song is said to be a thank-you present to their fans, as well as a way to celebrate their 1st anniversary since debut.

Composition
The song was written by and composed by Seo Yong-bae and Seo Jae-woo, and BtoB members Lee Minhyuk and Jung Ilhoon participated in writing the lyrics. As stated on their official website: "The single "2nd Confession" is a sweet track embraced by the warmth of spring. The track tells a story of a guy who confesses his unaffected loving feeling towards his ex-lover. The track's soothing melody and the narration in the beginning of the track allows the 90's radio kids to reminiscence about their past. On top of it, witty lyrics will put a smile on your face."

Music video
A video teaser for the song and music video was released on April 7. It shows member Lee Minhyuk and Danny Ahn from g.o.d on a radio program, reading a letter from a listener who wants to make their second confession to a girl. The full music video was released on April 11, one day after the song.

Promotions
The group debuted the song on April 11, performing on Mnet's music show M! Countdown, followed by performances on Music Bank, Show! Music Core and Inkigayo.

Track listing

Chart performance

Charts

Release history

References

Cube Entertainment singles
2013 singles
Korean-language songs
2013 songs
Songs written by Jung Il-hoon
BtoB songs